Storenes is a neighbourhood in the city of Kristiansand in Agder county, Norway. It is located in the borough of Vågsbygd and in the district of Vågsbygd.  The neighborhood is located along the Kristiansandsfjorden, southeast of Augland.

Transportation

References

Geography of Kristiansand
Neighbourhoods of Kristiansand